Mount Gilbert is a prominent  glaciated mountain summit located in the Chugach Mountains, in the U.S. state of Alaska. Although modest in elevation, relief is significant since the mountain rises up from tidewater at Harriman Fjord in Prince William Sound in less than six miles.

History

The peak was named in 1908 by Ulysses Sherman Grant and Daniel F. Higgins for Grove Karl Gilbert (1843-1918}, a geologist with the United States Geological Survey who was part of the 1899 Harriman Alaska expedition that explored this area. The mountain's name was officially adopted in 1910 by the U.S. Board on Geographic Names.

On June 14, 1960, a Pacific Northern Airlines Lockheed L-749A Constellation aircraft crashed near the summit, killing all 14 persons aboard. It was on the final leg of a flight from Seattle to Anchorage, after having just dropped off 52 cannery workers and fishermen in Cordova.

The first ascent of the peak was made May 29, 1962, by Paul B. Crews, Hans Metz, Helga Bading, and Bob Bailey, in what was described as poor weather conditions.

Climate

Based on the Köppen climate classification, Mount Gilbert is located in a subarctic climate zone with long, cold, snowy winters, and cool summers. Temperatures can drop below −20 °C with wind chill factors below −30 °C. This climate supports the Serpentine Glacier to the south, Colony Glacier to the north and west, and the Barry and Cascade Glaciers to the east. The months May through June offer the most favorable weather for climbing.

See also

List of mountain peaks of Alaska
Geography of Alaska

Gallery

References

External links
 Account of first ascent of Mt. Gilbert: American Alpine Club
 Weather forecast: Mount Gilbert
 Mount Gilbert weather: NOAA

Gilbert
Gilbert
Gilbert